An effective date or as of date is the date upon which something is considered to take effect, which may be a past, present or future date.  This may be different from the date upon which the event occurs or is recorded.

See also
Coming into force
Official birthday
Vacatio legis

References

Common law legal terminology